California State Building may signify:
 California State Building (Los Angeles)
 California State Building (Santa Ana)
 California State Office Building No. 1 (Jesse Unruh Office Building), 915 Capitol Mall in Sacramento
 California State Building at the Civic Center, San Francisco